The Art of Love is the eighth studio album by German singer Sandra released in 2007 by Virgin Records.

Background
The Art of Love is Sandra's first album not to be produced by her then-partner, Michael Cretu, who at that time was unavailable due to working on the new Enigma album, A Posteriori. It was also her last album released before their separation in late 2007. Instead, the material was produced by Jens Gad, Cretu's "right hand man". This change made Sandra actively participate in writing songs for the first time in her career. She contributed very personal lyrics, revisiting sad experiences from her childhood. The album also includes three cover versions: "Put Your Arms Around Me" originally recorded by Sinéad O'Connor, "All You Zombies" by The Hooters, and "Casino Royale", previously recorded by Edyta Górniak as "Sleep with Me" and Conjure One as "Sleep". "Love Is the Price" features DJ BoBo and is their second collaboration, after the 2006 hit "Secrets of Love". The promotional pictures for the album, shot in New York by Bärbel Miebach, saw Sandra return to her signature long hair and reveal a sexier image.

"The Way I Am" was released as the lead single from the album in January 2007 and reached no. 50 on the official German singles chart. "What Is It About Me" was released as the second single in May 2007 and failed to chart except for some airplay in russian Tophit charts reaching position 129.The single had three bonus tracks: the album track "What D'Ya Think of Me", French version of "What's Left to Say" ("Les qu'est-ce que c'est") and Spanish version of "Silence Beside Me" ("Silencio a mi lado").</ref></ref> "All You Zombies" was released as a promotional radio single in Poland. The album itself was a top 40 chart success in Germany and Poland.

Track listing
"What D'Ya Think of Me" (Jens Gad, Sandra Cretu) – 4:34
"The Way I Am" (Jens Gad, Sandra Cretu, Andru Donalds) – 3:31
"The Art of Love" (Jens Gad, Sandra Cretu) – 4:14
"What Is It About Me" (Winston Sela, Jens Gad, Torsten Stenzel, Ginger Mackenzie) – 3:54
"Dear God... If You Exist" (Jens Gad, Sandra Cretu) – 4:27
"Silence Beside Me" (Jens Gad, Sandra Cretu) – 3:38
"Once Upon a Time" (Fabrice Cuidad, Jens Gad, Sandra Cretu) – 4:52
"Put Your Arms Around Me" (Sinéad O'Connor, Rick Nowels) – 5:05
"What's Left to Say" (Fabrice Cuidad, Jens Gad, Christian Dornaus) – 4:36
"Casino Royale" (Rick Nowels, Billy Steinberg, Marie-Claire D'Ubaldo) – 3:51
"Love Is the Price" (with DJ BoBo) (Morrison Long, Steven Levis) – 3:23
"Shadow of Power" (Fabrice Cuidad, Jens Gad, Sandra Cretu) – 3:36
"All You Zombies" (Eric Bazilian, Rob Hyman) – 5:03

Charts

Certifications

References

External links
 The official Sandra website
 The official Sandra channel at YouTube
 The Art of Love on Discogs

2007 albums
Sandra (singer) albums
Virgin Records albums